Hugh Roe O'Donnell (Irish: Aodh Ruadh Ó Domhnaill), also known as Red Hugh O'Donnell (30 October 1572 – 10 September 1602), was a sixteenth-century leader of the Gaelic nobility of Ireland. He became Chief of the Name of Clan O'Donnell and Lord of Tyrconnell in 1593, following a lengthy succession dispute within the derbhfine of the O'Donnell dynasty, and after escaping a five-year imprisonment without trial in Dublin Castle. Along with his father-in-law Hugh O'Neill of Tyrone, he led an alliance of Irish clans in the Nine Years' War against the English government in Ireland. Hugh Roe led an Irish army to victory in the Battle of Curlew Pass. After defeat in the Siege of Kinsale, he travelled to Spain to seek support from King Philip III. Unsuccessful, he died in Spain and was succeeded by his younger brother Rory O'Donnell. He is sometimes also known as Aodh Ruadh II or Red Hugh II, especially in his native County Donegal.

Biography

Early life, imprisonment, and escape
For the political context of O'Donnell's life see the Tudor conquest of Ireland

Hugh Roe O'Donnell was born in 1572, as a son to the Chief of the Name and Lord of Tyrconnell, Sir Hugh O'Donnell, and his second wife, Fiona MacDonald, the daughter of the Chief of Clan MacDonald of Dunnyveg.  He was fostered by the MacSweeneys and O'Cahans and other cadet branches of the O'Donnell dynasty's derbhfine.<ref name=Hiram>[https://www.dib.ie/biography/odonnell-red-hugh-o-domhnaill-aodh-ruadh-a6343 Morgan, Hiram. "O'Donnell, ‘Red’ Hugh (Ó Domhnaill, Aodh Ruadh)", Dictionary of Irish Biography]</ref>

Hugh Roe had numerous brothers and sisters including Donnell, Rory and Cathbarr. His father, Sir Hugh, was a long-standing ally of the Crown, in an attempt to counterbalance the power of Shane O'Neill and Sir Turlough Luineach O'Neill, the Chiefs of Clan O'Neill in neighbouring Tír Eoghain. In Sir Hugh's later years, a long-running succession dispute broke out to determine who would succeed him. Although Fiona, better known as Iníon Dubh (Lit. "The Dark Lady", pronounced in Ulster Irish as 'In-neen Doo'), pushed for Red Hugh to become the Tanist of Tyrconnell, it was Red Hugh's elder half-brother Donnell O'Donnell who emerged as the leading candidate. The Crown chose to support Donnell as it regarded him as the least dangerous potential Clan leader, partly due to the fact that Donnell's mother was an Irishwoman while Red Hugh's mother was the daughter of a Scottish clan chief.

There were a number of other claimants to the O'Donnell Chiefdom including Hugh Roe's great uncle Hugh Dubh O'Donnell.

In 1587, at the age of fifteen, he was either married or betrothed to Rose O'Neill, the daughter of Hugh O'Neill, 2nd Earl of Tyrone. This cemented a growing alliance between the two clans. The same year he was kidnapped by Sir John Perrot, then the English Lord Deputy of Ireland, in an attempt to prevent an alliance between the O'Donnell and O'Neill clans. At Rathmullan, O'Donnell was invited aboard a ship from Dublin to drink wine but was then carried away as part of a pre-planned operation.

Meanwhile, Donnell O'Donnell's position as Chief of the Name was strengthened by the arrival of Royal Irish Army troops dispatched from Dublin Castle under the command of John Connill. Fiona MacDonald counteracted this by hiring large numbers of Redshank mercenaries from her native Scotland. She then defeated and killed her stepson at the Battle of Doire Leathan in 1590, while Red Hugh was a prisoner in Dublin.

Subsequently imprisoned in Dublin Castle, O'Donnell escaped briefly on Christmas Day 1591 but was recaptured within days.

Hugh O'Donnell made his successful escape only in January 1592, assisted by his High O'Neill's cousins Art and Henry O'Neill, who arranged for his flight from Dublin into the Wicklow Mountains in the depths of winter. It is likely, according to Hiram Morgan, that bribery played a part in his escape, and he was covertly assisted by the Lord Deputy William FitzWilliam. O'Donnell successfully reached the stronghold of Fiach McHugh O'Byrne (another of O'Neill's allies) at Glenmalure, where he found refuge, but he had lost both big toes to frostbite and his companion and fellow escapee Art O'Neill had died of hypothermia on the slopes of Conavalla. Hugh O'Donnell and his two companions, the brothers Art and Henry (Hugh) O'Neill, were the only prisoners ever to successfully escape from Dublin Castle.

The Nine Years War
Upon his return to Ulster, he gained the leadership of the O'Donnell Clan. At the "Rock of Doon", near Termon, he was acclaimed as, "The O'Donnell", Chief of the Name and Lord of Tyrconnell, after his father abdicated in his favour later that year. He successfully led two expeditions against Turlough Luineach O'Neill in 1593, to force Turlough O'Neill to abdicate his chieftainship in favour of Hugh O'Neill. At this point, O'Neill did not join O'Donnell in open war but secretly backed him to enhance their bargaining power with the English. O'Neill by now was also communicating with Philip II of Spain in a quest for military aid.

Declaring open rebellion against the English the following year, O'Donnell's forces captured Connacht from Sligo to Leitrim by 1595, and O'Donnell personally re-instated the Chiefdom of Clan MacWilliam in County Mayo, proclaiming his ally Tibbot MacWalter Kittagh Bourke as chief. In this year, Hugh O'Neill, Earl of Tyrone, abandoned negotiation with the English and in 1596 the combined forces of O'Donnell and O'Neill defeated an English army under Sir Henry Bagenal at the Battle of Clontibret.

Their greatest victory came two years later however at Battle of the Yellow Ford on the Blackwater River near the southern border of Tír Eoghain in August 1598. At this battle, the Irish annihilated an English force marching to break the siege of Blackwater Fort, five miles northwest of the English government's garrison town Armagh. Later that year, O'Donnell purchased Ballymote Castle from the Chief of Clan MacDonagh and subsequently made it his primary residence.

O'Neill then went south to secure the allegiance of Irish clans in Munster, without much success. O'Donnell raided Connacht, destroying the town of Athenry, laying waste to much of County Galway, and on being refused entry to Galway City, burned its suburbs:

"... he sent forth swift-moving marauding parties through the district of Caladh, and the upper part of the territory; and they carried off many herds of cows and other preys to O'Donnell, to the town of Athenry; and though the warders of the town attempted to defend it, the effort was of no avail to them, for O'Donnell's people applied fires and flames to the strongly-closed gates of the town, and carried to them great ladders, and, placing them against the walls, they recte, some of them ascended to the parapets of the wall. They then leaped from the parapets, and gained the streets of the town, and opened the gates for those who were outside. They all then proceeded to demolish the storehouses and the strong habitations; and they carried away all the goods and valuables that were in them. They remained that night in the town. It was not easy to enumerate or reckon the quantities of copper, iron, clothes, and habiliments, which they carried away from the town on the following day. From the same town he sent forth marauding parties to plunder Clanrickard, on both sides of the river; and these marauders totally plundered and ravaged the tract of country from Leathrath to Magh-Seanchomhladh. The remaining part of his army burned and ravaged the territory, from the town of Athenry and Rath-Goirrgin Westwards to Rinn-Mil and Meadhraige, and to the gates of Galway, and burned Teagh-Brighde, at the military gate of Galway".

As a result of these and other assaults, however, O'Donnell was unable to persuade the local Irish clans to join him.

However, in the next two years, O'Donnell and O'Neill were hard-pressed with the deployment of thousands more English troops in the country. O'Donnell repulsed an English expedition towards western Ulster at the Battle of Curlew Pass in 1599, but his and O'Neill's position was increasingly defensive. Even worse for O'Donnell than English offensives was the defection of his kinsman {cousin and Brother-in-law}, Niall Garve O'Donnell to the English side, in return for their backing his own claim the O'Donnell Chiefdom. Niall Garve's brothers and hundreds of Clan O'Donnell warriors also joined his efforts to seize the Chiefdom with the support of the Crown. Hugh Roe was allegedly so outraged by this, that he killed Niall Garve's infant son (and his own nephew) by beating him to death. Niall Garve's support allowed the English to land a seaborne force at Derry in the heart of Tyrconnell and capture the O'Donnell stronghold of Lifford in the Battle of Lifford. O'Donnell led an unsuccessful Siege of Donegal while the garrison there was commanded by Niall Garve.

By this time, O'Neill and O'Donnell recognised that their only chance of winning the war outright was with the aid of a Spanish invasion. The Spanish finally landed at Kinsale – at virtually the opposite end of Ireland from the Northern clans in September 1601. O'Donnell led his warriors in a hard march during the winter of 1601, often covering over 40 miles a day, to join O'Neill and the Spanish General Juan del Águila at Kinsale arriving in early December 1601.

En route, true to his family arms and Constantinian motto In Hoc Signo Vinces and in anticipation of the battle to come at Kinsale, he visited and venerated a supposed relic of the True Cross, the Holy rood, on the Feast of St. Andrew, on 30 November 1601 at Holy Cross Abbey, and removed a portion of it. From there he sent an expedition to Ardfert in County Kerry, to win a quick victory and successfully recover the territory of his ally, James Fitzmaurice, Lord of Kerry, who had lost it and his 9-year-old son, to Sir Charles Wilmot. Red Hugh also left some O'Donnell clansmen behind in Ardfert to guard the Barony of Clanmaurice, notably his first cousin and nephew, Domhnall Óg, son of his half-brother, Sir Domhnall O'Donnell, and who appears in the FitzMaurice pardon of 16 July 1604.

During the Battle of Kinsale on 5/6 January 1602 the combined forces of Del Águila, O'Neill and O'Donnell were defeated by Sir Charles Blount, Lord Mountjoy. As the Irish clans retreated from Kinsale, O'Donnell announced his plan to travel to Spain to seek further support from King Philip III. This demoralised his supporters despite O'Donnell's vow he would return by the next spring with twenty thousand Spanish soldiers.

Flight to Spain and death
After the Irish defeat at Kinsale, O'Donnell left Ireland on 6 January 1602 and sailed to Corunna in Galicia, Spain, where many other Irish clan chiefs were already arriving as refugees with their families. There he was received with great honours by the Governor of Galicia and the Lord Archbishop of Santiago de Compostela, where an Irish College was founded. He was also taken to "visit the Tower of Betanzos, where according to bardic legends the sons of Milesius left to the Isle of Destiny".

While based in Corunna, he plotted a return to Ireland and travelled to Valladolid to ask further assistance from King Philip III, who promised to organise a new invasion of Ireland. As a year passed and O'Donnell did not receive any news from Philip III of Spain, he left again for Valladolid but he died en route and was buried at Simancas Castle in 1602. He was attended on his death-bed by Archbishop of Tuam Fláithrí Ó Maol Chonaire and two friars from Donegal named Father Muiris mac Donnchadh Ulltach and Father Muiris mac Seaán Ulltach.

The Anglo-Irish double-agent, James "Spanish" Blake, is alleged to have poisoned O'Donnell. The Calendar of the Carew Manuscripts, preserved in the Archepiscopal Library at Lambeth, 1601–1603, was copied and published in 1870 by Longmans, Green & Co. in London detailing the official preserved letters from Sir George Carew, President of Munster during part of the Nine Years' War, to Charles Blount, Lord Mountjoy, who was nominated as Lord Lieutenant over Ireland by Queen Elizabeth I. Some of these letters were written in cipher, but the key to the cipher was to use a substitute letter six spaces earlier in the alphabet. In the letter from Carew to Mountjoy dated 28 May 1602, Carew reported to Mountjoy "One James Blake...took a solemn oath to do service...and is gone into Spain with a determination (bound with many oaths) to kill O'Donnell",  and then another letter, written partially in cipher, was sent from Carew to Mountjoy dated 9 October 1602, "O'Donnell is dead... he is poisoned by James Blake, of whom your lordship hath been formerly acquainted...". With his death Spanish plans to send further assistance to the Irish clans were abandoned.

It is, however, unlikely that he was poisoned. A more probable cause of death was the tapeworm that Simancas documents of the time stated to be the cause of his demise. It should be said that spies often make improbable claims for their actions, and in this case, as in many others, it seems very likely that Carrew exaggerated the success of his actions. O'Donnell's Last Will and Testament, written in his dying moments with his loyal retinue, is an extremely evocative and moving document. One original is preserved in Simancas and the other in the Chancellery archive in Valladolid.

He was buried in the chapter of the Franciscan monastery in Valladolid. Though the building was demolished in 1837, the exact location of the tomb may have been discovered following a Spanish archaeological dig in May 2020. If his remains are successfully identified, they will be returned for burial in County Donegal.

Thomas McGreevy's poem Aodh Ruadh Ó Domhnaill describes a search for his grave:Juan de Juni, the priest said,Each J becoming H,Berruguete, he said,and the G was aspirate,Ximénez, he said thenAnd aspirated first and last.But he never saidAnd -- it seemed odd -- heNever had heardThe aspirated nameOf the centuries-deadBright-haired young manWhose grave I sought.McGreevy describes how, whenThey broughtHis blackening bodyHereTo restPrinces cameWalkingBehind itAnd all Valladolid knew And out to Simancas all knew Where they buried Red Hugh.Aodh was succeeded as chief of the Clan O'Donnell by his brother, Rory O'Donnell, created the 1st Earl of Tyrconnell the following year by the English Crown. Rory succeeded Red Hugh as both King of Tír Chonaill and leader of the Red Hugh O'Donnell faction within the divided dynasty. His sister Nuala O'Donnell was married to his kinsman and rival Niall Garve O'Donnell

Family

Legacy

He was highly praised in the Irish language writings of the early seventeenth century for his nobility and religious commitment to the Catholic faith – notably in the Annals of the Four Masters and Beatha Aodh Ruadh Ó Domhnaill ("The Life of Red Hugh O'Donnell") by Lughaidh Ó Cléirigh. Although his posthumous reputation has been somewhat overshadowed by that of his ally Hugh O'Neill, his leadership and military capabilities were considerable, especially considering that he was active at a very young age and only 29 years old at the Battle of Kinsale. His personality seems to have been particularly magnetic, and contemporary sources are united in their praise of his oratorical ability.

In 1843, Michael Joseph MacCann wrote the song "O'Donnell Abu" in tribute, drawing on the tradition of romantic nationalism which was popular during the era.

In 1977, the Aodh Ruadh O Domhnaill Guild was formed to seek his recognition as a saint of the Catholic Church.

In 1991, a plaque was erected at Simancas Castle in commemoration of Red Hugh O'Donnell.

In 1992, commemorating the 390th anniversary of the arrival of O'Donnell in Galicia, the Grammy-award-winning composer of Riverdance, Bill Whelan, brought together musicians from Ireland and Galicia and released the symphony From Kinsale to Corunna.

In September 2002, Eunan O'Donnell, BL, gave the Simancas Castle Address in honour of Red Hugh, during the O'Donnell Clan Gathering to Spain.

Aodh Ruadh CLG in Ballyshannon, County Donegal is named after Red Hugh O'Donnell.

Red Hughs GAA club in Crossroads, Killygordon, County Donegal are named after Red Hugh O'Donnell.

In popular culture
 In his 1861 poem Eirinn a' Gul ("Ireland Weeping"), Uilleam Mac Dhunlèibhe, an important figure in 19th century Scottish Gaelic literature, recalled the many stories about his fellow Gaels in Inis Fáil (Ireland) he had heard in the Ceilidh houses of Islay, before that island was emptied by the Highland Clearances. He then lamented the destruction wreaked upon the Irish people by both famine and similar mass evictions ordered by Anglo-Irish landlords. He particularly laments the loss of the Chiefs of the Irish clans, who led their clansmen in war and provided "leadership of the old and true Gaelic kind". Mac Dhun Lèibhe comments sadly that the mid-19th century fighters for Irish republicanism had none of the heroic qualities shown by Red Hugh O'Donnell, Hugh O'Neill, and Hugh Maguire during the Nine Years War against Queen Elizabeth I. Sadly, but expressing hope for the future of the Irish people, Mac Dhun Lèibhe closes by asking where are the Irish clan warriors who charged out of the mist and slaughtered the armies of the Stranger at the Battle of the Yellow Ford and the Battle of Moyry Pass.
 Hugh O'Donnell is the subject of the Irish ballad "If These Stones Could Speak", as featured on the Phil Coulter album Highland Cathedral.
 Hugh O'Donnell serves as the main character in the 1966 Walt Disney feature film The Fighting Prince of Donegal in which he is portrayed by Peter McEnery.
 He is the subject of James Clarence Mangan's poem Ceann Salla.
 He is a major character in Brian Friel's 1989 play Making History.

See also
 O'Donnell
 Irish kings
 Tyrconnell
 County Donegal
 Kings of Tir Connaill
 Early Modern Ireland 1536-1691

Notes

Bibliography

 Ekin, Des. The Last Armada: Siege of 100 Days: Kinsale 1601. O'Brien Press, 2014.
 Klossner, Michael. The Europe of 1500–1815 on Film and Television: A Worldwide Filmography of Over 2550 Works, 1895 Through 2000. McFarland & Company, 2002.
 (audio book)

Further readingThe O’Donnells of Tyrconnell – A Hidden Legacy, by Francis Martin O'Donnell, published by Academica Press LLC in London and Washington, D.C., 2018, (750 pages). 
'Simancas Castle Address',Adhamhnan O Domhnaill, Journal of Donegal Historical Society, p. 94–96
'Niall Garbh O'Donnell – A man more sinned against than sinning', Eunan O'Donnell, BL, Journal of the Donegal Historical Society, 2000 & 1941.The Life of Hugh Roe O'Donnell, Prince of Tyrconnell (Beatha Aodh Ruadh O Domhnaill) by Lughaidh O'Cleirigh. Edited by Paul Walsh and Colm Ó Lochlainn. Irish Texts Society, vol. 42. Dublin: Educational Company of Ireland, 1948 (original Gaelic manuscript in the Royal Irish Academy in Dublin).Red Hugh: Prince of Donegal, by Robert T. Reilly, Farrar, Straus & Giroux, 1957.O'Donel of Destiny, by Mary Kiely, Oxford, New York, 1939 (a narrative history for older children).Annals of the Kingdom of Ireland (Annála Ríoghachta Éireann) by the Four Masters, from the earliest period to the year 1616, compiled during the period 1632–1636 by Brother Michael O’Clery, translated and edited by John O'Donovan in 1856, and re-published in 1998 by De Burca, Dublin.A View of the Legal Institutions, Honorary Hereditary Offices, and Feudal Baronies established in Ireland, by William Lynch, Fellow of the Society of Antiquaries, published by Longman, Rees, Orme, Brown, and Green, Paternoster Row, London, 1830 (O’Donnell: page 190, remainder to Earl’s patent).Vicissitudes of Families, by Sir Bernard Burke, Ulster King of Arms, published by Longman, Green, Longman and Roberts, Paternoster Row, London, 1861. (Chapter on O’Donnells, pages 125–148).The Fate and Fortunes of the Earls of Tyrone (Hugh O’Neill) and Tyrconnel (Rory O’Donel), their flight from Ireland and death in exile, by the Rev. C. P. Meehan, M.R.I.A., 2nd edition, James Duffy, London, 1870.Elizabeth's Irish Wars, by Cyril Falls, London, 1950.Erin's Blood Royal – The Gaelic Noble Dynasties of Ireland, by Peter Berresford Ellis, Constable, London, 1999, (pages 251–258 on the O'Donel, Prince of Tirconnell).Red Hugh: The Story of Hugh Roe O'Donnell by Shirley D. Starke, The Aodh Ruadh O Domhnaill Guild, 1985.Red Hugh'' by Deborah Lisson, Bunbury Western Australia, 1998, Published by Lothian Books.

External links 
The Life of Aodh Ruadh Ó Domhnaill, transcribed from the Book of Lughaidh Ó Clérigh
The Hugh O'Donnell Guild
The O'Donnell Coat of Arms and Family History
Aodh Rua Ó Domhnaill Genealogy

1572 births
1602 deaths
Irish Roman Catholics
Irish people of Scottish descent
Hugh
People of Elizabethan Ireland
People from Lifford
Kings of Tír Chonaill
16th-century Irish people
17th-century Irish people
16th-century Roman Catholics
17th-century Roman Catholics
People of the Nine Years' War (Ireland)
Irish chiefs of the name